In linguistics and philosophy of language, an utterance is felicitous if it is pragmatically well-formed. An utterance can be infelicitous because it is self-contradictory, trivial, irrelevant, or because it is somehow inappropriate for the context of utterance. Researchers in semantics and pragmatics use felicity judgments much as syntacticians use grammaticality judgments. An infelicitous sentence is marked with the pound sign.

The terms felicitous and infelicitous were first proposed by J. L. Austin as part of his theory of speech acts. In his thinking, a performative utterance is neither true nor false, but can instead be deemed felicitous or infelicitous according to a set of conditions whose interpretation differs depending on whether the utterance in question is a declaration ("I sentence you to death"), a request ("I ask that you stop doing that") or a warning ("I warn you not to jump off the roof").

Felicity conditions for declarations
 Conventionality of procedure: the procedure (e.g. an oath) follows its conventional form
 Appropriate participants and circumstances: the participants are able to perform a felicitous speech act under the circumstances (e.g. a judge can sentence a criminal in court, but not on the street)
 Complete execution: the speaker completes the speech act without errors or interruptions

Felicity conditions for requests
 Propositional content condition: the requested act is a future act of the hearer
 Preparatory precondition: 1) the speaker believes the hearer can perform the requested act; 2) it is not obvious that the hearer would perform the requested act without being asked
 Sincerity condition: the speaker genuinely wants the hearer to perform the requested act
 Essential condition: the utterance counts as an attempt by the speaker to have the hearer do an act

Felicity conditions for warnings
 Propositional content condition: it is a future event
 Preparatory precondition: 1) the speaker believes the event will occur and be detrimental to the hearer; 2) the speaker believes that it is not obvious to the hearer that the event will occur
 Sincerity condition: the speaker genuinely believes that the event will be detrimental to the hearer
 Essential condition: the utterance counts as an attempt by the speaker to have the hearer recognize that a future event will be detrimental

See also
John Searle
 Illocutionary act
 Pragmatics

References
 Austin, J. L. (1962) How to Do Things With Words. Oxford University Press.
 Searle, J. R. (1969) Speech acts. Cambridge University Press.

Pragmatics
Semantics
Linguistics
Philosophy of language